Beers Brook may refer to: 

 Beers Brook (East Brook)
 Beers Brook (West Branch Delaware River tributary)